Alfonso Virgen Meza (August 20, 1889 – January 29, 1975) was a Mexican aviator.

References

1889 births
1958 deaths
Mexican military personnel
Mexican aviators
People from Jalisco